Charleston Baptist Temple is a historic Baptist church located at Charleston, West Virginia. It is a two-story, brick church with Georgian and Federal style details.  It was designed by architect Ernest Flagg and constructed in 1924. It is composed of a central sanctuary block with matching wings and a rear addition constructed in 1955. The facade features a central tower, which contains the steeple. The spire is copper-clad and flares out to cover an open belfry with decorated engaged Corinthian columns and arched openings.  Directly below the belfry is a baluster area above the clock portion of the tower.

It was listed on the National Register of Historic Places in 2000.

Gallery

References

20th-century Baptist churches in the United States
Baptist churches in West Virginia
Buildings and structures in Charleston, West Virginia
Churches in Kanawha County, West Virginia
Colonial Revival architecture in West Virginia
Federal architecture in West Virginia
Georgian Revival architecture in West Virginia
National Register of Historic Places in Charleston, West Virginia
Churches on the National Register of Historic Places in West Virginia
Churches completed in 1924
Clock towers in West Virginia